Salix rorida is a species of willow native to Japan, northern China, Korea, and the Russian Far East. It is a deciduous tree, reaching a height of 10 m.

References 

rorida